Kisu Qutu (Aymara kisu magnetite, qutu little heap, "magnetite heap", Hispanicized spelling Quesocoto) is a  mountain in the north of the Wansu mountain range in the Andes of Peru. It is situated in the Apurímac Region, Antabamba Province, Oropesa District. Kisu Qutu lies southwest of Willkarana.

References 

Mountains of Peru
Mountains of Apurímac Region